Aube is a commune in the Orne department in the Normandy region in northwestern France.

Population
The inhabitants are known as Albins.

See also
Communes of the Orne department

References

Communes of Orne